The Silabukan Protection Forest Reserve is located in Sabah, Malaysia. It was established in 1992. Although 8% of Sabah's land area is included in the system of national parks, most of Sabah's orangutans do not occur in official protected areas, they are instead found in production forest landscapes in the eastern Sabah Foundation concession, which includes Silabukan Forest Reserve (McConkey et al. 2005).

Flora and fauna
In 2022, a blooming Rafflesia keithii was discovered in the reserve during a World Wildlife Fund inventory.

References

McConkey, K., Caldecott, J. and McManus, E. 2005. Malaysia. In Caldecott, J., Miles, L. (eds) 2005. World Atlas of Great Apes and their Conservation. Prepared by the UNEP World Conservation Monitoring Centre. University of California Press, Berkeley, USA.

Protected areas established in 1992
Borneo
Forestry in Malaysia
Forest reserves of Sabah
1992 establishments in Malaysia
Borneo lowland rain forests